Mayhem Festival 2012 was the fifth annual Mayhem Festival. Dates were announced on October 26, 2011.

Mayhem Festival 2012 lineup

Main stage
 Slipknot
 Slayer
 Motörhead
 Rotating band slot

Rotating bands
Bands rotated between opening main stage and supporting Anthrax on Jägermeister stage
 The Devil Wears Prada (June 30 – July 11)
 As I Lay Dying (July 13 – July 24)
 Asking Alexandria (July 25 – August 5)

Jägermeister stage
 Anthrax
 Rotating band slot
 Rotating band slot
 Whitechapel
 Upon A Burning Body (June 30 – July 11)
 Betraying the Martyrs (July 13 – July 24)
 I the Breather (July 25 – August 5)
 Silvertung (August 5)
 Jägermeister Battle of the Bands Winner

Sumerian Records stage
 Upon A Burning Body (July 13 – August 5)
 I the Breather (June 30 – July 24)
 Betraying the Martyrs (June 30 – July 11) (July 25 – August 5)
 Dirtfedd
 Sumerian Stage local Headbang for the Highway Battle of the Bands Winner (Thrown Into Exile – 6/30), (Karin Comes Killing – 7/4) (Depths of Mariana – 7/29), (Spiral Fracture – 7/29), (Eyes of Torment -  7/14)

Dates

References

Mayhem Festival by year
2012 concert tours
2012 music festivals
2012 festivals in the United States
June 2012 events in the United States
July 2012 events in the United States
August 2012 events in the United States